Karen Ruth Bass (born October 3, 1953) is an American politician, social worker and former physician assistant who has been serving as the 43rd mayor of Los Angeles since 2022. She also served in the California State Assembly from 2004 to 2010 and spent her final term serving as speaker.

A Los Angeles native, Bass attended college at California State University, Dominguez Hills and the University of Southern California. She spent her career as a physician assistant and community activist before seeking public office. Before her election to Congress, Bass represented the 47th district in the California State Assembly for six years. In 2008, she was elected to serve as the 67th Speaker of the California State Assembly, becoming the first African-American woman in United States history to serve as a speaker of a state legislative body. She won the John F. Kennedy Profile in Courage Award in 2010 for her leadership during the Great Recession.

Bass was first elected to the U.S. House of Representatives in 2010. She represented California's 33rd congressional district during her first term, though redistricting moved her to the 37th district in 2012. She chaired the Congressional Black Caucus during the 116th Congress. She also chaired the United States House Foreign Affairs Subcommittee on Africa, Global Health, Global Human Rights and International Organizations and the United States House Judiciary Subcommittee on Crime, Terrorism and Homeland Security.

Bass won the 2022 Los Angeles mayoral election to become the first woman and second black mayor of Los Angeles. She was ceremonially sworn in on December 11, 2022 by Vice President Kamala Harris. Bass began her term the following day, December 12.

Early life and education 
Bass was born in Los Angeles, California, the daughter of Wilhelmina (née Duckett) and DeWitt Talmadge Bass. Her father was a postal letter carrier and her mother was a homemaker. She was raised in the Venice and Fairfax neighborhoods of Los Angeles and graduated from Alexander Hamilton High School in 1971.

Witnessing the civil rights movement on television with her father as a child sparked her interest in community activism. While in middle school, Bass began volunteering for Bobby Kennedy's presidential campaign. In the mid-1970s she was an organizer for the Venceremos Brigade, a pro-Cuban group that organized trips by Americans to Cuba. She visited Cuba eight times in the 1970s.

She went on to study philosophy at San Diego State University from 1971-1973, and graduated from the USC Keck School of Medicine Physician Assistant Program in 1982. She then earned a bachelor of science degree in health sciences from California State University, Dominguez Hills in 1990. She also received her master's degree in social work from the University of Southern California in 2015.

Community Coalition and the crack cocaine epidemic 
In the 1980s, while working as an emergency medicine physician assistant and a clinical instructor at the Keck School of Medicine of USC Physician Assistant Program, Bass witnessed the impact of the crack epidemic in South Los Angeles. After attending "Crack: The Death of a Race", a San Francisco conference hosted by the Reverend Cecil Williams, she decided to organize a response.

In the late 1980s, Bass and other local community organizers founded Community Coalition, an organization with a mission to help transform the social and economic conditions in South Los Angeles that foster addiction, crime, violence, and poverty by building a community institution that involves thousands in creating, influencing, and changing public policy.

California State Assembly 
In 2004, Bass was elected to represent California's 47th Assembly district. At her inauguration, she became the only African-American woman serving in the state legislature. She was reelected in 2006 and 2008 before her term limit expired. Bass served the cities and communities of Culver City, West Los Angeles, Westwood, Cheviot Hills, Leimert Park, Baldwin Hills, View Park-Windsor Hills, Ladera Heights, the Crenshaw District, Little Ethiopia and portions of Koreatown and South Los Angeles.

Leadership prior to speaker election 
Speaker Fabian Núñez appointed Bass California State Assembly majority whip for the 2005–06 legislative session and majority floor leader for the 2007–08 legislative session. During her first term, she founded and chaired the California Assembly Select Committee on Foster Care, implementing a host of new laws to help improve the state's foster care system and leading the effort to secure $82 million in additional funding for the state's child welfare system. Under her direction, the Select Committee passed legislation designed to improve the lives of California's most vulnerable children.

During her term as majority whip, Bass also served as vice chair of the Legislative Black Caucus. As vice chair, she commissioned the first ever "State of Black California" report, which included a statewide organizing effort to involve Black Californians in town halls in every part of the state with a prevalent Black community to solicit ideas for a legislative agenda. The result of the report was a legislative agenda for the Black community that was released during her term as majority floor leader.

Speakership 
Núñez termed out of the Assembly at the end of the 2007–08 session, leaving Bass as the next-highest-ranking Democrat in the Assembly. After consolidating the support of a majority of legislators, including some who had previously been planning to run for the speakership themselves, Bass was elected speaker on February 28, 2008, and sworn in on May 13, 2008.

As speaker, Bass promoted numerous laws to improve the state's child welfare system. During her first year, she ushered through expansion of Healthy Families Insurance Coverage to prevent children from going without health insurance and worked to eliminate bureaucratic impediments to the certification of small businesses. She also secured more than $2.3 million to help revitalize the historic Vision Theater in Los Angeles and more than $600 million for Los Angeles Unified School District. Bass worked with the governor and initiated the California Commission on the 21st-Century Economy to reform California's tax code. She also fought to repeal the California Citizens Redistricting Commission.

California budget crisis (2008–2010) 

Bass became speaker during a period of severe economic turmoil. Negotiations over a spending plan to address a multi-billion dollar budget shortfall began the day Bass was sworn in. A statement by the John F. Kennedy Foundation included the following description of events: In February 2009, amid one of the worst budget crises in California's history, an imploding economy, and potentially catastrophic partisan deadlock, the state's Republican and Democratic party leaders came together to address the financial emergency. After weeks of grueling negotiation, the legislative leaders and Gov. Schwarzenegger reached an agreement on a comprehensive deal to close most of a $42 billion shortfall, putting an end to years of government inaction and sidestepping of the difficult decisions necessary to address California's increasingly dire fiscal crisis. The deal was objectionable to almost everyone; it contained tax increases, which the Republicans had long pledged to oppose, and draconian spending cuts, which brought intense criticism to the Democrats. The two Republicans were ousted from their party leadership positions over the agreement. Voters defeated the budget referendum in May 2009.In June 2009, Bass drew criticism from conservative commentators for statements she made during an interview with Los Angeles Times reporter Patt Morrison in response to a question about how conservative talk radio affected the Assembly's efforts to pass a state budget. Referencing the condemnation from conservative talk radio hosts that three Republicans experienced after they voted for a Democrat-sponsored plan to create revenue by raising taxes, Bass described the pressures Republican lawmakers face:  The Republicans were essentially threatened and terrorized against voting for revenue. Now [some] are facing recalls. They operate under a terrorist threat: "You vote for revenue and your career is over." I don't know why we allow that kind of terrorism to exist. I guess it's about free speech, but it's extremely unfair.Bass, Dave Cogdill, Darrell Steinberg, and Michael Villines received the 2010 Profile in Courage Award for their leadership in the budget negotiations and their efforts to address the severe financial crisis. In presenting them with the award, Caroline Kennedy said: Faced with a budget crisis of unprecedented magnitude, Karen Bass, Dave Cogdill, Darrell Steinberg and Mike Villines had the courage to negotiate with Governor Arnold Schwarzenegger and with each other on a compromise they believed was in the best interest of the citizens of California. Each made sacrifices, and each knew their agreement would have painful and far-reaching consequences for their constituents and for their own careers.

U.S. House of Representatives

Elections

2010 

In 2010, Congresswoman Diane Watson retired from Congress and encouraged Bass to run for her seat. Bass was ineligible to run for reelection to the State Assembly in 2010 due to California's term limits so on February 18, 2010, Bass confirmed her candidacy to represent California's 33rd congressional district.

Bass raised $932,281.19 and spent $768,918.65. Her 2010 campaign contributions came from diverse groups, with none donating more than 15% of her total campaign funds. The five major donors to her campaign were labor unions, with $101,950; financial institutions, with $90,350; health professionals, with $87,900; the entertainment industry, with $52,400; and lawyers and law firms, with $48,650.

Bass won the election with over 86% of the vote on November 2, 2010.

2012 

In redistricting following the 2010 census, the district was renumbered from 33rd to 37th. In 2012 she had no primary opponent and won the general election with 86% of the vote. She raised $692,988.53 and spent $803,966.15, leaving $52,384.92 on hand and a debt of $3,297.59.

Bass was involved in President Barack Obama's reelection campaign. She played a leadership role in the California African Americans for Obama organization and served on Obama's national African American Leadership Council. Bass had also served as a co-chair of African Americans for Obama in California during the 2008 presidential campaign.

2014 

Bass was reelected to a third term with 84.3% of the vote.

2016 

Bass was reelected to a fourth term with 81.1% of the vote. She endorsed Hillary Clinton for president in 2015. On August 3, 2016, Bass launched a petition to have then-candidate Donald Trump psychologically evaluated, suggesting that he exhibited symptoms of narcissistic personality disorder (NPD). The petition was signed by 37,218 supporters. She did not attend President Trump's inauguration after conducting a poll on Twitter.

2018 

Fueled by Trump's election and in an effort to channel Angelenos' political frustrations, Bass created the Sea Change Leadership PAC to activate, educate, and mobilize voters. She won her primary with 89.18% of the vote and was reelected to a fifth term with 88.2% of the vote.

House speakership speculation 
After the 2018 elections, Democrats regained the majority in the House of Representatives. Representative Seth Moulton and others who felt the current leadership was "too old" gathered signatures to replace Nancy Pelosi as the Democrats' leader. Bass was their first choice for leader, but she rejected the offer, supporting Pelosi for speaker. On November 28, 2018, Pelosi won the speakership on a 203-to-32 vote.

Committee assignments
 Committee on the Judiciary
Subcommittee on Crime, Terrorism, Homeland Security and Investigations (Chair)
Subcommittee on Courts, Intellectual Property and the Internet
 Committee on Foreign Affairs
Subcommittee on Africa, Global Health, and Human Rights (Chair)

Caucus memberships 
Congressional Black Caucus (chair; 2019-2021)
Congressional Caucus on Foster Youth, Founder and Co-Chair
Congressional Coalition on Adoption (CCA)
American Sikh Congressional Caucus
Congressional Addiction, Treatment and Recovery Caucus
Coalition for Autism Research and Education (CARE)
Congressional Caucus on Black Men and Boys
Congressional Creative Rights Caucus
Congressional Diabetes Caucus
Congressional Entertainment Industries Caucus
Congressional Ethiopia Caucus
Congressional HIV/AIDS Caucus
Congressional International Conservation Caucus
Congressional LGBT Equality Caucus
Congressional Library of Congress Caucus
Congressional Military Mental Health Caucus
Congressional Multiple Sclerosis Caucus
Congressional Quiet Skies Caucus
Congressional Social Work Caucus
Congressional Valley Fever Task Force
Congressional Progressive Caucus
Medicare for All Caucus

Bass served as the second vice chair of the Congressional Black Caucus during the 115th Congress. She was elected chair of the Congressional Black Caucus on November 28, 2018, and served in that capacity from 2019 to 2021.

Vice presidential and Biden administration speculation 
In July 2020, Bass was discussed as a potential running mate for presumptive Democratic presidential nominee Joe Biden. Biden reportedly narrowed the field of possible vice presidential selections to a few women, and Bass "gained real traction in the late stage of the search". Politico called Bass "a bridge-building politician who can draw accolades and concessions from both sides of the aisle".

During this time, a video emerged of Bass speaking at the 2010 opening of a Scientology church in Los Angeles outside her district. Bass gave a speech praising the Church of Scientology for fighting against inequality, singling out the words of founder L. Ron Hubbard "that all people of whatever race, color or creed are created with equal rights." In 2020, Bass defended her past remarks, tweeting that she had addressed "a group of people with beliefs very different than my own" and "spoke briefly about things I think most of us agree with". Additionally, Bass tweeted, in reference to the Church of Scientology, that "[s]ince then, published first-hand accounts in books, interviews and documentaries have exposed this group."

When Biden chose Kamala Harris as his running mate, Bass tweeted, "@KamalaHarris is a great choice for Vice President. Her tenacious pursuit of justice and relentless advocacy for the people is what is needed right now."

In November 2020, Biden considered Bass for Secretary of Housing and Urban Development and Secretary of Health and Human Services. Ultimately, Biden nominated California Attorney General Xavier Becerra to the post.

Mayor of Los Angeles

2022 election 

On September 27, 2021, Bass announced her candidacy for mayor of Los Angeles in the 2022 election. Her campaign focused on addressing causes of Los Angeles's homelessness problem and ending homeless encampments around elementary schools and public parks and beaches. Former mayor Antonio Villaraigosa endorsed Bass. Bass was the top vote earner in the June 7 primary and faced Rick Caruso in the November runoff, On November 16, the Associated Press declared her the mayor-elect. Caruso spent $100 million of his own money on his campaign.

Tenure 
Bass was officially sworn in by the Los Angeles City Clerk on December 10, 2022, succeeding Eric Garcetti. The following day, she was ceremonially sworn in by Vice President Kamala Harris at a public inauguration event. She officially assumed office on December 12. Bass is the first woman and the second Black person, after Tom Bradley, to serve as mayor of Los Angeles. Fulfilling a campaign promise, Bass declared a city state of emergency on homelessness as her first act as mayor.

Political positions

United States–Africa relations 

Throughout her time in Congress, Bass has been the top Democrat on the United States House Foreign Affairs Subcommittee on Africa, Global Health, Global Human Rights and International Organizations. Her goal is to transform how Washington engages African nations and to promote the many opportunities to expand trade and economic growth between them and the U.S. One of her key priorities was to reauthorize and strengthen the African Growth and Opportunity Act (AGOA), which enables African nations to export goods to the U.S. duty-free. In 2015, Bass was instrumental in reauthorizing the bill.

Bass has advocated preventing and ending famine in Africa. In 2017, she helped secure nearly $1 billion in funds to combat famine in Nigeria, Somalia, and South Sudan. She has also introduced more than 50 bills and resolutions pertaining to democracy protection, expanding economic opportunity, and other issues in Africa. Bass continues to engage the African diaspora with regular popular policy breakfasts, which are open to the public.

Armenia and Artsakh 

During the Second Nagorno-Karabakh War, Bass supported H.Res.1203 and H. Res. 1165, condemning the military offensive launched by Azerbaijani and Turkish-backed forces on Artsakh.

In response to the Armenian National Committee of America's endorsement for the 2022 Los Angeles mayoral election, Bass stated "For the past few decades, I have worked to hold Azerbaijan accountable and support the people of Artsakh."

In response to the 2022 blockade of the Republic of Artsakh, Bass stated “I stand with the Armenian community here in Los Angeles calling for an end to the blockade of the Lachin Corridor. We must clearly demonstrate our commitment to freedom by helping the people of Artsakh. This is a crisis and will only get worse with inaction. Lives are at stake.” In a joint letter addressed to President Joe Biden, Bass and President of the Los Angeles City Council Paul Krekorian demanded the following:
 Providing direct U.S. humanitarian assistance to Artsakh, including food and medical supplies
 Making clear to Putin and Aliyev that the United States demands and will act to ensure the safe passage of flights into Artsakh to provide aid
 Assertive U.S. diplomatic engagement to facilitate negotiations between Baku and Stepanakert to guarantee the rights and security of the Armenian population of Artsakh
 Insisting that Russian troops in Artsakh be replaced by international peacekeepers
 Taking tangible action against the regime in Azerbaijan to hold it accountable for its crimes pursuant to Section 907 of the FREEDOM Support Act and the Magnitsky Act.

Child welfare reform 
Upon arriving in Congress, Bass founded the Congressional Caucus on Foster Youth (CCFY), a bipartisan group of members of Congress that develops policy recommendations to strengthen the child welfare system. One of the group's most significant achievements was the passage of the Family First Prevention Services Act, also known as Family First, which was signed into law as part of the Bipartisan Budget Act on February 9, 2018. This reform aims to change child welfare systems across the country by addressing the top reasons children are removed from their homes and placed in foster care.

Starting in May 2012, the Caucus began hosting an annual Foster Youth Shadow Day, during which foster youth come to Washington DC for a week to learn about advocating for reforms to the child welfare system. The week culminates in Shadow Day, when participants spend a day following their member of Congress through their daily routine. Bass serves on the organization's board of directors.

Committee on Caucus Procedures 
Nancy Pelosi appointed Bass to chair the Democratic Committee on Caucus and Procedures, previously known as the Committee on Oversight, Study and Review (OSR), in 2014. She served in that capacity for six years. The committee is responsible for reviewing and recommending rules for the House of Representatives Democratic caucus.

Criminal justice 
Bass believes that the criminal justice system is broken in part due to the disproportionate incarceration rates of poor people of color. Bass has long called for criminal justice reform and to pay special attention to the way women are treated by the criminal justice system: how they originally entered the system, how they are treated in prison, and what happens to them after they are released. Bass previously served as Chair of the House Judiciary Subcommittee on Crime, Terrorism, and Homeland Security.

In 2018, she voted in favor of the First Step Act, which focused on rehabilitating people in prison by incentivizing them with the possibility of an earlier release. Her contribution to the bill was a section addressing what she considers the inhumane practice of shackling women during pregnancy, labor and delivery.

Environment 
Bass believes that climate change is one of the greatest challenges facing the country and the world. Shortly before EPA Administrator Scott Pruitt resigned, she signed a letter to Trump demanding that Pruitt be fired for ethics violations. Bass also strongly supports the Paris Climate Agreement, and was one of the first 30 members of Congress to support the Green New Deal.

Gun law 
While campaigning for Congress in 2010, Bass supported legislation that with other regulations would have required all gun dealers to report sales to the federal government.

Bass participated in the 2016 sit-in against gun violence in the House of Representatives. Democratic members of Congress adopted the slogan "No Bill, No Break" in an attempt to push the introduction of gun control legislation.

Following a burglary of her home in the Baldwin Vista neighborhood of Los Angeles in 2022, Bass confirmed that two legally registered handguns she owned had been stolen.

Bass strongly supports legislation to prohibit the sale, transfer, manufacture, and importation of semiautomatic weapons and ammunition-feeding devices capable of accepting more than ten rounds in the United States. In 2019, she voted in favor of legislation to require a background check for every firearm sale and to close the loophole that allowed a gun to be acquired in the Charleston church massacre.

Health care 
Bass supports universal health care and was one of the founders of the Congressional Medicare for All Caucus. She has voted more than 60 times against repeal of the Patient Protection and Affordable Care Act, believing that Congress should improve it rather than repeal it.

Housing 
In 2022, Bass said that she supported more housing in Los Angeles, but opposed changing zoning regulations so that denser housing would be allowed in neighborhoods that mandate single-family housing. At the time, three-quarters of all residentially zoned land in Los Angeles was exclusively zoned for single-family housing.

Immigration 
In July 2018, Bass visited a federal facility used to detain migrant families and children separated from their parents after calling for the resignation of Department of Homeland Security Secretary Kirstjen Nielsen. She also introduced the Family Unity Rights and Protections Act, which would require the federal government to reunite families that have been forcibly separated at the border.

Bass supports Jesús "Chuy" García's New Way Forward Act, which calls for immigration reform.

Affirmative action 
Bass has supported a ballot proposal in California to repeal the ban on race-based admission policies.

Impeachment of Donald Trump 
Bass voted for the proposed articles of impeachment against Trump. Of the vote, she tweeted, "He abused the power of his office. He obstructed Congress. No one is above the law."

Intellectual property 
Bass is in favor of net neutrality and has supported legislation to protect the internet from attempts to roll back regulations. She supported the 2018 Music Modernization Act, which creates a formalized body, run by publishers, that administers the "mechanical licensing" of compositions hosted on music streaming services.

Israel 
In 2020 Bass was one of more than 115 House Democrats to sign a letter criticizing Israel's plan to annex parts of Palestinian territory in the occupied West Bank. She co-sponsored House Resolution 729, which expressed support for defense aid to Israel.

Jobs 
Bass has fought to give tax reductions for small businesses to hire new employees, increase the flow of credit to small businesses so they can grow and create jobs, and extend the research and development tax credit that encourages innovation and job creation. She also introduced the Local Hire Act to allow cities and counties to prioritize hiring local residents for infrastructure projects. The rule resulted in new jobs in Los Angeles. In May 2018, Bass and members of the Congressional Black Caucus introduced the Jobs and Justice Act of 2018, omnibus legislation that would increase Black families' upward social mobility and help ensure equal protection under the law.

LGBTQ rights 
In 2018, the Los Angeles Stonewall Democratic Club named Bass its Public Official of the Year. In 2019, she voted in favor of the Equality Act, which would ban discrimination against LGBTQ people in housing, employment, education, credit and financing, and more.

Student loan debt 
In 2019, Bass introduced two pieces of legislation to address student loan debt. The Student Loan Fairness Act of 2019 addresses this crisis in three major ways: creating a new "10-10" standard, capping the interest rate, and accounting for cost of living. With Danny Davis, she also introduced the Financial Aid Fairness for Students (FAFSA) Act, which would repeal a law that makes it all but impossible for people with a drug conviction to receive federal financial aid for higher education.

Taxes 
Bass is considered a liberal in her fiscal positions. She has a rating of 10% from the conservative California Tax Payers Association. The more liberal Consumer Federation of California gives her very high ratings. Bass has supported keeping taxes low for the middle class and "tax credits for small businesses to hire new employees". She has said that the Bush tax cuts for the wealthy should expire. In 2017, she voted against the Tax Cuts and Jobs Act, citing its disproportionate impact on California's middle-class families.

George Floyd Justice in Policing Act 

After the murder of George Floyd and massive nationwide protests, Bass and Representative Jerry Nadler co-authored the George Floyd Justice in Policing Act of 2020, aimed at restraining police practices such as chokeholds, carotid holds, and no-knock warrants, and making it easier to prosecute police if they break the law.

The bill passed the Democratic-controlled House of Representatives on a mostly party-line vote of 220–212, but not the evenly divided Senate amid opposition from Republicans. Negotiations between Republican and Democratic senators on a reform bill collapsed in September 2021.

Personal life 
From 1980 to 1986, Bass was married to Jesus Lechuga. Following their divorce, Bass and Lechuga jointly raised their daughter and her siblings, Bass's four stepchildren, Scythia, Omar, Yvette, and Ollin. Her daughter, Emilia Bass-Lechuga, and son-in-law, Michael Wright, were killed in a car crash in 2006.

September 2022 burglary 
On September 9, 2022, Bass's Los Angeles home was burglarized and two firearms were stolen. In a public statement, Bass called the incident "unnerving" and "something that far too many Angelenos have faced." According to Bass, the firearms had been securely stored, and no other valuables were taken from her home. As of September 14, two suspects in the criminal investigation were detained at the LAPD Valley Jail awaiting trial on residential burglary charges. In an interview, Bass said the incident "shattered" her sense of safety within Los Angeles.

See also 

 List of African-American United States representatives
 List of female speakers of legislatures in the United States
 List of mayors of the 50 largest cities in the United States
 Women in the United States House of Representatives

References

Footnotes

Sources

External links 

 Office of Mayor Karen Bass official mayoral website
 Karen Bass for Mayor campaign website

|-

|-

|-

|-

|-

|-

|-

1953 births
20th-century African-American people
20th-century African-American women
21st-century African-American women
21st-century American politicians
21st-century American women politicians
African-American mayors in California
African-American members of the United States House of Representatives
African-American state legislators in California
African-American women in politics
Alexander Hamilton High School (Los Angeles) alumni
American women academics
California State University, Dominguez Hills alumni
Democratic Party members of the California State Assembly
Democratic Party members of the United States House of Representatives from California
Female members of the United States House of Representatives
Living people
Mayors of Los Angeles
People from South Los Angeles
Politicians from Los Angeles
Speakers of the California State Assembly
University of California regents
University of Southern California faculty
Women legislative speakers
Women mayors of places in California
Women state legislators in California